Desperate Choices: To Save My Child is a 1992 television film directed by Andy Tennant. It stars Joanna Kerns and Bruce Davison. It was nominated for two Young Artist Awards in 1992. The film was retitled Solomon's Choice for home video and rebroadcast.

Cast
Joanna Kerns as Mel Robbins
Bruce Davison as Richard Robbins
Joseph Mazzello as Willy Robbins
Jeremy Sisto as Josh Ryan
Bruce McGill as Dan Ryan
Reese Witherspoon as Cassie Robbins
William Newman as Dr. Edwards
Steven Gilborn as Dr. Andrews
 Rondi Reed as Dr. Brunell

References

External links

1992 films
Films directed by Andy Tennant